Argyle Street - derived from "Argyle", an archaic spelling of "Argyll", a county in western Scotland - is the name of a street in many cities and towns. Notable among these are:

Australia
Argyle Street, the Rocks, Sydney
Argyle Street, Hobart, Tasmania
Argyle Street, Fitzroy, Melbourne
Argyle Street, Parramatta, New South Wales
Argyle Street, Camden, New South Wales
Argyle Street, Picton, New South Wales
Argyle Street, Moss Vale, New South Wales

Canada
Argyle Street, Campbellton
Argyle Street, Glace Bay
Argyle Street (Halifax)
Argyle Street, Toronto
 Argyle Street, Caledonia
 Argyle Street, Montreal

Hong Kong
Argyle Street, Hong Kong

United Kingdom
England
Argyle Street, Bath
Argyle Street, Birkenhead
Argyle Street, Cambridge
Argyle Street, Heywood
Argyle Street, London
Argyle Street, Norwich
Argyle Street, Reading
Northern Ireland
Argyle Street, Derry
Scotland
Argyle Street, Dornoch
Argyle Street, Dundee
Argyle Street, Edinburgh
Argyle Street, Glasgow
Argyle Street railway station, Glasgow
Argyle Street, Greenock
Argyle Street, Lossiemouth
Argyle Street, Paisley
Argyle Street, St Andrews
Argyle Street, Ullapool

United States
Argyle Street, Chicago
Argyle Street, Hollywood

Malaysia
Argyle Road, Penang

See also
Argyle (disambiguation)
Argyll